Schiebroek is a former village in the province of South Holland, Netherlands. It is now a neighbourhood of Rotterdam, and part of the borough of Hillegersberg-Schiebroek.

Schiebroek was a separate municipality between 1817 and 1941, when it became part of Rotterdam.

References

Former municipalities of South Holland
Neighbourhoods of Rotterdam